Monogenous in mathematics may refer to:

 A synonym for cyclic in
 monogenous group, a synonym for cyclic group
 monogenous module, a synonym for cyclic module

See also
 Monogenic (disambiguation)
 Monogenetic (disambiguation)